Smoker is a noun derived from smoke and may have the following specialized meanings:
 Someone who smokes tobacco or cannabis, cigarette substitutes, or various other drugs
 Smoking (cooking), smoker, an apparatus for smoking (cooking technique) 
 Bee smoker, a tool used in beekeeping
 Räuchermann, a German figurine used for burning incense
 A stag film

People 
 Smoker (surname)

Fictional characters 
 Smoker (One Piece), a character from the manga and anime One Piece
 A smoker, or copper-burner, one of the types of allomancer in Brandon Sanderson's fantasy Mistborn series
 Smoker, a special infected in the 2008 game Left 4 Dead
 The antagonists in the 1995 film Waterworld

Other uses 
 Smokers (Footlights), performances by Cambridge University Footlights Dramatic Club, typically late-night shows presenting a collection of sketches and comedy songs
 Smoking concert
 The Smokers (film), a 2000 film directed and written by Kat Slater
 The Smokers (painting), a 1630s painting by Adriaen Brouwer
 Black smoker, a type of hydrothermal vent
 White smoker, a type of hydrothermal vent
 Smoker parrot, colloquial name for the regent parrot
 "The Smoker," a short story by David Schickler
 Smoker or smoking car, a car on a passenger train, in which smoking is permitted, just as a sleeper or sleeping car is where passengers can sleep
 In baseball, another term for fastball.

See also
 Chain smoker
 Smoking (disambiguation)